Uunijuusto is a Finnish dish made from cow's colostrum, the first milk of a calved cow, by adding a pinch of salt (some 0.5 grams per a litre of milk) and by baking the milk in an oven (30 minutes in 150 degrees Celsius, and for a few moments in 250 degrees to slightly brown it on top). Sometimes uunijuusto is also made from ordinary milk and eggs. In Sweden, the dish is named kalvdans (calve's dance).

The word uunijuusto literally means "oven cheese", but uunijuusto is not properly a cheese.

Uunijuusto is typically eaten for dessert with berries (often cloudberries) or jam or mehukeitto, a soup made from fresh berries such as lingonberries or redcurrants.

See also

 Kalvdans
 List of dairy products
 List of desserts

References

Finnish desserts
Finnish cheeses
Dairy products